Odesa State Academy of Civil Engineering and Architecture, was a higher education establishment founded in 1930 as part of the Ukrainian education system. Since 1991 The Academy has been a member of the European and International Association of Universities, and in 2007 it signed the Bologna Convention. The Academy's education process is carried out according to the multilevel system: Bachelor - Specialist - Master.

References

Education in Odesa
Educational institutions established in 1930
1930 establishments in the Soviet Union